Brümilda van Rensburg is a South African actress. She is perhaps best known for her role as Louwna in the TV series Egoli: Place of Gold. She attained her BA Honours in Drama cum laude from the University of Pretoria. Brumilda  has won many prestigious awards, such as Best Actress at the Fleur du Cap Theatre Awards, among others.

Career
While working with CAPAB she was honored with a prestigious Fleur du Cap award for her role as Cassandra in The Orestian Trilogy.

She rose to prominence on the local screen for her role interpretation of the bitchy Adele in Wolwedans in die Skemer.

She was also cast as a political journalist in Binnekring and played as Alicia Francke in season 2 of Ballade vir ‘n Enkeling. The role of Judith in Stolen Lives followed and further gained her prominence.

Her work as Marie in Exit the King earned her a Vita Award and she was a two times nominee for the Most popular SA female actress award. In 1995, she bagged the award.

Brumilda also teaches drama and speaks (as a motivational speaker) across South Africa.

She was a host on her radio talk show on Punt radio for one year. Under the label Brümilda, the veteran actress developed a range of clothes.

She has experience spanning over twelve years of dance training, modern and classic. More to her name is producing three plays for the art festivals and directing some inserts for the SABC.

Brumilda played the lead in om ‘goodbye’ te sê in London to standing ovations in 2000. She landed the starring role of Rika Naude in Hartland, a kykNET drama series.

Helena King in High Rollers was another starring role she landed. She appeared in the SABC3 drama series in 2013.

In 2014, she was cast as Jana du Prees in Binnelanders, a kykNET soap opera.

Filmography

 Leading Lady, 2014
 Musiek vir die Agtergrond, 2013
 The Power of Three, 2011 as Olivia
 Eternity, 2010 as Lilian Shapiro
 Brutal Glory (video), 1989 as Lottie
 Dancing in the Forest, 1989

Television

Binnelanders, 2014 as Jana du Preez
High Rollers, 2013 as Helena King
Hartland, 2011
Ballade vir 'n Enkeling II, 1993 as Alicia Francke
Egoli: Place of Gold, 1992-2010 as Louwna Edwards
Die Binnekring, 1990

Stage

Hamlet – Ophelia
The Oresteia – Dieter Reible
Faust - Dieter Reible
Exit the King
Agamemnon
Atigoni
Come back little Sheba
Die Soen
Siener in die Suburbs

References

1. 
2. 
3. 
4. 
5. 
6.

External links

 http://www.brumilda.com
 

1956 births
Living people
South African film actresses
South African television actresses
South African stage actresses
21st-century South African actresses